Geometric Mouse, Variation I, Scale A is an abstract sculpture by Claes Oldenburg. created in 1971.

Examples are located at the Hirshhorn Museum and Sculpture Garden, Museum of Modern Art, and Walker Art Center.

See also
 List of public art in Washington, D.C., Ward 2

References

1971 sculptures
Abstract sculptures in Minnesota
Abstract sculptures in New York City
Abstract sculptures in Washington, D.C.
Aluminum sculptures in New York City
Aluminum sculptures in Washington, D.C.
Mice and rats in art
Hirshhorn Museum and Sculpture Garden
Outdoor sculptures in Washington, D.C.
Sculptures by Claes Oldenburg
Sculptures of the Smithsonian Institution
Steel sculptures in Minnesota
Steel sculptures in New York City
Steel sculptures in Washington, D.C.